Campbell Walsh (born 26 November 1977 in Glasgow) is a Scottish slalom canoeist who competed at the international level from 1995 to 2012. Competing in two Summer Olympics, he won a silver medal in the K1 event in Athens in 2004.

Walsh won three medals at the ICF Canoe Slalom World Championships with a silver (K1 team: 2009) and two individual bronzes (K1: 2006, 2007). He is the overall World Cup Champion in K1 from 2004. He is the 2008 individual European Champion, and the 2009 European Team Champion along with Richard Hounslow and Huw Swetnam. He also has 1 silver and 2 bronze medals from the European Championships.

World Cup individual podiums

1 World Championship counting for World Cup points

References

12 September 2009 final results for the men's K1 team event at the 2009 ICF Canoe Slalom World Championships. - Retrieved 12 September 2009.
ICF medalists for Olympic and World Championships - Part 2: rest of flatwater (now sprint) and remaining canoeing disciplines: 1936-2007.

1977 births
Canoeists at the 2004 Summer Olympics
Canoeists at the 2008 Summer Olympics
Living people
Olympic canoeists of Great Britain
Olympic silver medallists for Great Britain
Sportspeople from Glasgow
Scottish male canoeists
Olympic medalists in canoeing
Scottish Olympic medallists
Medalists at the 2004 Summer Olympics
British male canoeists
Medalists at the ICF Canoe Slalom World Championships